Cross-country skiing at the 1988 Winter Paralympics consisted of 38 events, 23 for men and 15 for women.

Medal table

Medal summary 
The competition events were:
2.5 km: - women
5 km: men - women
10 km: men - women
15 km: men
20 km: men
30 km: men
3x2.5 km relay: men
3x5 km relay: - women
4x5 km relay: men
4x10 km relay: men

Each event had separate standing, sitting, or visually impaired classifications:

LW2 - standing: single leg amputation above the knee
LW 3 - standing: double leg amputation below the knee, mild cerebral palsy, or equivalent impairment
LW4 - standing: single leg amputation below the knee
LW5/7 - standing: double arm amputation
LW6/8 - standing: single arm amputation
LW9 - standing: amputation or equivalent impairment of one arm and one leg
Gr I - sitting: paraplegia with no or some upper abdominal function and no functional sitting balance
Gr II - sitting: paraplegia with fair functional sitting balance
B1 - visually impaired: no functional vision
B2 - visually impaired: up to ca 3-5% functional vision

Men's events

Women's events

See also
Cross-country skiing at the 1988 Winter Olympics

References 

 
The information from the International Paralympic Committee (IPC) website is based on sources which does not present all information from earlier Paralympic Games (1960-1984), such as relay and team members. (Per nov.20, 2010)
 
 Historical Medallists : Vancouver 2010 Winter Paralympics, Official website of the 2010 Winter Paralympics
 Winter Sport Classification, Canadian Paralympic Committee

1988 Winter Paralympics events
1988
Paralympics